XHSLS-TDT channel 35 (virtual channel 9) is a television station in San Luis Potosí, San Luis Potosí which is owned by the state government. It is known as Nueve TV and carries local and national public television programming.

History
On November 1, 1985, the Dirección del Centro de Producción de Televisión Imevisión de San Luis Potosí (Imevisión Television Production Center San Luis Potosí) was launched to produce local opt-out programming for Imevisión. By 1990, given changing circumstances and the impending privatization of Imevisión, the agreement had been phased out, and instead a new television station was built, XHSLS-TV channel 9; XHSLS was permitted in May 1987 and replaced an earlier station on channel 7. It boasted repeaters in Matehuala (XHATS-TV channel 4, which stopped operating early in the 2000s) and Tamazunchale (XHAZS-TV channel 6). XHAZS never operated in digital, and its concession was not renewed.

XHSLS signed on in digital in July 2015. The digital facility was more powerful than the analog channel 9, whose actual effective radiated power was lower than authorized due to an aging transmitter. The station shut off its analog signal on December 16, 2015, along with other San Luis Potosí stations.

Historia

Toma inicio con fecha 28 de octubre de 1985 y mediante el Decreto publicado el 1 de noviembre del mismo año, se creó la Dirección del Centro de Producción de Televisión INMEVISIÓN de San Luis Potosí, como un medio de comunicación del Gobierno del Estado destinado a transmitir programas específicos orientados al mejoramiento de las condiciones de vida de los habitantes del Estado de San Luis Potosí, operando con base en un convenio celebrado con la Dirección General de Radio, Televisión y Cinematografía a través de la Red de Televisión Rural de México, con un permiso que sería otorgado el 12 de mayo de 1987.

Para el 23 de enero de 1990 se expidió el Decreto que constituyó la Unidad de Televisión San Luis Potosí, XHSLS Canal 9, como organismo público descentralizado de Gobierno Estatal, con personalidad jurídica y patrimonio propios, ya que por razones de crecimiento para el desarrollo de las actividades y gestión de recursos del canal,  fue emitido dicho documento. Tiempo después se da una escasa recuperación del gasto de inversión, mantenimiento y operación del organismo, por lo que se decretó su extinción, creando en su lugar la Comisión de Televisión Educativa de San Luis Potosí, dándose a conocer en el Periódico Oficial del Estado el 26 de febrero de 2002.

Mientras que para el 13 de julio de 2015, el Gobierno del Estado de San Luis Potosí, presentó una solicitud ante el Instituto Federal de Telecomunicaciones para transitar al régimen de concesión de uso público del canal, por lo dicha Institución otorgó el permiso el día 14 de junio del 2017, para usar y aprovechar bandas de frecuencia del espectro radioeléctrico para uso público. La concesión por su parte permite, en los términos de la Ley, que el Canal 9 pudiera allegarse de recursos adicionales por actividades propias, que desde luego quedarían condicionados a la reinversión y mejoramiento del propio medio de comunicación.

Por consiguiente actualmente es un Organismo Público Descentralizado de la Administración Pública Estatal, sectorizado a la Secretaría General de Gobierno del Estado de San Luis Potosí, creado por Decreto Administrativo, publicado en el periódico oficial del Estado el día 21 de noviembre de 2017, el cual es denominado oficialmente como Instituto de Televisión Pública de San Luis Potosí XHSLS Canal 9, que lleva por sus siglas “ITPSLP XHSLS Canal 9”, el cual tiene la finalidad de difundir la cultura, el arte, la educación y el entretenimiento, así como para promover el fomento de los valores y principios democráticos.

References

Public television in Mexico
Mass media in San Luis Potosí City
Television stations in San Luis Potosí